Oktay Mahmuti (born 6 March 1968) is a Turkish-Macedonian professional basketball coach. Mahmuti is well-known for coaching defense, particularly during his time with Efes and Benetton Treviso. He is currently unemployed.

Coaching career
In 1992, Mahmuti began his professional level coaching career with Efes Pilsen. On 12 January 2018, Mahmuti was named the head coach of Galatasaray, of the Turkish Basketball Super League (BSL).

Personal life
Mahmuti was born to Turkish parents living in Skopje. Mahmuti graduated from Istanbul University Faculty of Pharmacy.

Honors

Club
Efes Pilsen
 Turkish Super League Champion (4): 2001–02, 2002–03, 2003–04, 2004–05
 Turkish Cup Winner (4): 2001, 2002, 2006, 2007
 Turkish Cup Runner-Up (1): 2004
 Turkish President's Cup Winner (1): 2006
 EuroLeague Quarter-finalist (3): 2004–05, 2005–06, 2012–13
 SuproLeague: Final Four (1): 2001
Benetton Treviso
 EuroCup Final eight (1): 2008–09
Galatasaray Medical Park
 Turkish President's Cup Winner (1): 2011

Personal
Benetton Treviso
 EuroCup Coach of the Year: 2008–09
Anadolu Efes
 100th win in European competitions with Anadolu Efes

References

External links
 EuroLeague Coaching Profile

1968 births
Living people
Basketbol Süper Ligi head coaches
Darüşşafaka Basketbol coaches
Anadolu Efes S.K. coaches
Galatasaray S.K. (men's basketball) coaches
Macedonian people of Turkish descent
Macedonian Turks
Pallacanestro Treviso coaches
Turkish basketball coaches
Turkish men's basketball players
Turkish expatriate basketball people in Italy
Sportspeople from Skopje